William Stagg (born 17 October 1957) is an English retired footballer who played as a left winger in the Football League for Brentford. He also played in Sweden and the United States. Stagg's  height ties him with Hughie Reed for the record of shortest Brentford player.

Career 
A graduate of the Brentford youth team, Stagg made four appearances for the club during the 1974–75 Fourth Division season at the age of 16 and dropped into non-League football upon his release at the end of the campaign. Between 1975 and 1990 he played for Wealdstone (two spells), Staines Town, Aylesbury United, Hazells, Tonbridge Angels, Northwood (three spells), Hendon and St Albans City. He also had short spells with American Soccer League and Swedish Division 2 clubs Pennsylvania Stoners and GAIS respectively.

Career statistics

References

1957 births
Living people
People from Ealing
English footballers
Brentford F.C. players
English Football League players
Isthmian League players
Association football wingers
Wealdstone F.C. players
Aylesbury United F.C. players
Tonbridge Angels F.C. players
GAIS players
Northwood F.C. players
Hendon F.C. players
St Albans City F.C. players
National League (English football) players
Southern Football League players
English expatriate footballers
English expatriate sportspeople in Sweden
English expatriate sportspeople in the United States
Staines Town F.C. players
Pennsylvania Stoners players
American Soccer League (1933–1983) players